Ivan Plachkov (b. 23 November 1957, Krynychne, Bolhrad Raion, Odesa Oblast) is a Ukrainian politician of Bulgarian descent. Plachkov was Ukraine's Minister of Energy in 1999 and again Minister of Fuel and Energy of Ukraine between 2005 and 2006.

Political activity 
In 2021, he made an analysis of Ukraine's energy sector, calling for a review of the regulatory policy of the electricity market, pointing out that on the threshold of energy security is the "Trojan Horse", filled with cheap electricity from Russia and Belarus. In particular, it was emphasized that the energy sector is in a state of illiterate regulation, inaction, released a brief vision of overcoming the crisis.

References

External links 
 Biography

1957 births
Living people
People from Odesa Oblast
Our Ukraine (political party) politicians
Fuel and energy ministers of Ukraine
Ministers of Energy of Ukraine
Chevaliers of the Order of Merit (Ukraine)
Bessarabian Bulgarians
Ukrainian people of Bulgarian descent
Governors of Odesa Oblast
Laureates of the State Prize of Ukraine in Science and Technology
Recipients of the Honorary Diploma of the Cabinet of Ministers of Ukraine